Curry Mallet (anciently "Cory Mallett") is a village and parish in Somerset, England. The village has a population of 306.

History
At the time of the Domesday Book in 1086 the manor was held by Roger de Courselles, also the owner of Fisherton in Wiltshire, which was held under Curry. It later passed to the Malet (also spelt as Mallet or Mallett) family, with William Malet, one of the guarantors of Magna Carta, lord of the manor in 1215. It passed on through the descendants of the Malet family until 1356 when it was sold to Sir Matthew Gourney and his family until 1443 when the estate passed to the king and became part of the Duchy of Cornwall.

Curry Mallet was part of the hundred of Abdick and Bulstone.

The Manor House is a Grade II* listed building, includes a Great Hall (or perhaps a barn) of the 15th century, and a small irregular manor house of the late 16th century. It stands on the site of, and incorporates parts of, the castle built by William Malet, a Norman knight who fought at the Battle of Hastings.

In World War II, pillboxes were placed in the village as part of the Taunton Stop Line.

Governance

The parish council has responsibility for local issues, including setting an annual precept (local rate) to cover the council's operating costs and producing annual accounts for public scrutiny. The parish council evaluates local planning applications and works with the local police, district council officers, and neighbourhood watch groups on matters of crime, security, and traffic. The parish council's role also includes initiating projects for the maintenance and repair of parish facilities, as well as consulting with the district council on the maintenance, repair, and improvement of highways, drainage, footpaths, public transport, and street cleaning. Conservation matters (including trees and listed buildings) and environmental issues are also the responsibility of the council.

The village falls within the Non-metropolitan district of South Somerset, which was formed on 1 April 1974 under the Local Government Act 1972, having previously been part of Langport Rural District. The district council is responsible for local planning and building control, local roads, council housing, environmental health, markets and fairs, refuse collection and recycling, cemeteries and crematoria, leisure services, parks, and tourism.

Somerset County Council is responsible for running the largest and most expensive local services such as education, social services, libraries, main roads, public transport, policing and fire services, trading standards, waste disposal and strategic planning.

It is also part of a county constituency represented in the House of Commons of the Parliament of the United Kingdom. It elects one Member of Parliament (MP) by the first past the post system of election, and was part of the South West England constituency of the European Parliament prior to Britain leaving the European Union in January 2020, which elected seven MEPs using the d'Hondt method of party-list proportional representation.

Religious sites

The parish Church of St James has 13th-century origins and has been designated as a Grade I listed building.

School 
Curry Mallet Primary School is the small community Church of England school located within the village.

Legends and Haunting of the Manor 
In legend three streams are said to run under the manor leading directly to the holy well at the foot of Glastonbury Tor.

Although unsubstantiated, numerous reports exist of the haunting of the manor house. The most frequently reported apparition is that of a woman in Elizabethan costume. In addition, the Great Hall is said to be haunted by a pacing man. The sound of metallic clashes, possibly resulting from a ghostly duel, have been heard echoing in the courtyard.

References

External links

Villages in South Somerset
Civil parishes in Somerset